Threecastles GAA is a Gaelic Athletic Association club located in County Kilkenny, Ireland. Threecastles play at the adult grade of junior.

Honours

 Kilkenny Senior Club Hurling Championship (2): 1898, 1903
 '''Kilkenny Junior Hurling Championships: (1) 1940

External links
Threecastles GAA page on GAA Info

Gaelic games clubs in County Kilkenny
Hurling clubs in County Kilkenny